Mayhem Festival 2015 was the eighth and final annual Mayhem Festival. It was confirmed that Slayer, King Diamond, Hellyeah and The Devil Wears Prada will be headlining the festival, while Whitechapel, Thy Art Is Murder, Jungle Rot and Sister Sin would be among those supporting. Dates were announced on April 13, 2015.

Mayhem Festival 2015 lineup

Main stage 
 Slayer
 King Diamond
 Hellyeah
 The Devil Wears Prada

Victory Records Stage 
 Whitechapel
 Thy Art Is Murder
 Jungle Rot
 Sister Sin
 Sworn In
 Shattered Sun
 Feed Her to the Sharks
 Code Orange
 Kissing Candice

Dates 

°July 22, New Hampshire's show was cancelled and was replaced with Erie, Pennsylvania.

References 

Mayhem Festival by year
2015 in American music
2015 music festivals
2015 festivals in the United States
June 2015 events in the United States
July 2015 events in the United States
August 2015 events in the United States